Michael Burton FBA is an English psychologist and professor at the Department of Psychology at University of York.

Early life and education 
He earned his bachelor's degree in Mathematics and Psychology in 1980 and his Doctorate in Psychology at University of Nottingham in 1983.

Research 
His primary research interest is in face perception and identification using experimental and computational modelling approaches.

He has published over 100 papers in peer-reviewed journals. He was elected as a Fellow of the British Academy (FBA) in 2017.

References 

Year of birth missing (living people)
Living people
Alumni of the University of Nottingham
Academics of the University of York
English psychologists
Fellows of the British Academy